The 2017–18 Liga ASOBAL, also named Liga ASOBAL by sponsorship reasons, is the 28th season since its establishment.

Promotion and relegation 
Teams relegated to 2017–18 División de Plata
 DS Auto Gomas Sinfín
 BM Villa de Aranda

Teams promoted from 2016–17 División de Plata
 Condes de Albarei Teucro
 MMT Seguros Zamora

Teams

League table

External links
Liga ASOBAL Official website

Liga ASOBAL seasons
1
Spa